William David Hutton (January 28, 1910 – March 1, 1974) was a Canadian professional ice hockey defenceman who played two seasons in the National Hockey League (NHL) for the Ottawa Senators, Boston Bruins and Philadelphia Quakers.

Career statistics

Regular season and playoffs

External links

1910 births
1974 deaths
Boston Bruins players
Boston Cubs players
Calgary Tigers players
Canadian ice hockey defencemen
Detroit Olympics (IHL) players
Duluth Hornets players
Ottawa Senators (1917) players
Ottawa Senators (original) players
Philadelphia Arrows players
Philadelphia Quakers (NHL) players
Ice hockey people from Calgary
Syracuse Stars (IHL) players
Tulsa Oilers (AHA) players
Canadian expatriate ice hockey players in the United States